Ashyk Aydyn Pir is the patron saint of singers and bards, in Turkmen tradition.

Mausoleum 
Aydyn Pir's mausoleum is located in the Daşoguz region of Turkmenistan, north of Diyarbekir. It is venerated by thousands of Turkmen, esp. those in pursuance of a career in music; they sleep on its steps, hoping to meet Pir in their dreams.

References 

Eastern Orthodox saints